Dhaperhat Union is a union parishad under Sadullapur Upazila of Gaibandha District, Bangladesh. According to the 2011 Bangladesh census, Dhaperhat Union had 7,695 households and a population of 30,597. The union is a major producer of turmeric.

References

Populated places in Rangpur Division
Unions of Sadullapur Upazila